Martin Dematteis (born 24 May 1986) is an Italian male mountain runner and sky runner, one time senior individual European champion at European Mountain Running Championships (2016).

He won a bronze medal in the sport of athletics at senior level with the national team at the 2009 European Cross Country Championships held in Dublin, Ireland.

Biography
He won 8 medals at the World Mountain Running Championships (all with the national team) and 4 at individual level at the European Mountain Running Championships. He also competed at one edition of the IAAF World Cross Country Championships at senior level in 2010.

His twin brother Bernard Dematteis is also a mountain runner.

Achievements

Mountain running

National titles
Italian Mountain Running Championships
Mountain running: 2009, 2010, 2011 (3)
Italian Long Distance Mountain Running Championships
Long distance mountain running: 2019 (1)

See also
 Italy at the World Mountain Running Championships
 Italy at the European Mountain Running Championships

References

External links
 

1986 births
Living people
Italian male mountain runners
Italian male long-distance runners
Italian sky runners
Italian twins
Twin sportspeople
People from Sampeyre
21st-century Italian people